Alfred Edgar Coppard (4 January 187813 January 1957) was an English author, noted for his poetry and short stories.

Life

Coppard was born the son of a tailor and a housemaid in Folkestone, and had little formal education. Coppard grew up in difficult, poverty-stricken circumstances; he later described his childhood as "shockingly poor" and
Frank O'Connor described Coppard's early life as "cruel". He quit school at the age of nine to work as an errand boy for a Jewish trouser maker in Whitechapel during the period of the Jack the Ripper murders.

During the early 1920s, still unpublished, he was in Oxford and was part of a literary group, the New Elizabethans, who met in a pub to read Elizabethan drama. W. B. Yeats sometimes attended the meetings. During this period he met Richard Hughes and Edgell Rickword, amongst others.

Coppard was a member of the Independent Labour Party for a period. Coppard's fiction was influenced by Thomas Hardy and was compared favourably to that of H. E. Bates. Coppard's work enjoyed some popularity in the United States after his Selected Tales was chosen as a selection by the Book of the Month Club.

In his mini-biography in Twentieth Century Authors, Coppard lists Abraham Lincoln as the politician he admired most. Coppard also listed Sterne, Dickens, James, Hardy, Shaw, Chekhov and Joyce as authors he valued; conversely, he expressed a dislike for the works of D. H. Lawrence, T. E. Lawrence, and Rudyard Kipling.

Some of Coppard's collections, such as Adam and Eve and Pinch Me and Fearful Pleasures, contain stories with fantastic elements, either of supernatural horror or allegorical fantasy.

In Nancy Cunard's 1937 book Authors take Sides on the Spanish War, Coppard endorsed the Republicans.

A. E. Coppard was the uncle of George Coppard, a British soldier who served with the UK Machine Gun Corps during World War I, known for his memoirs With A Machine Gun to Cambrai.

Critical reception
Coppard's short stories were praised by Ford Madox Ford and Frank O'Connor. Coppard's book Nixey's Harlequin received good reviews from Leonard Strong, Gerald Bullett, and The Times Literary Supplement (which praised Coppard's "brilliant virtuosity as a pure spinner of tales"). Coppard's supernatural fiction was admired by Algernon Blackwood. Brian Stableford argues that Coppard's fantasy has a similar style to that of Walter de la Mare and that "many of his mercurial and oddly plaintive fantasies are deeply disturbing".

Works

Story collections
 Adam & Eve & Pinch Me (1921)
 Clorinda Walks in Heaven (1922)
 The Black Dog and Other Stories (1923)
 Fishmonger's Fiddle: Tales (1925)
 The Field of Mustard (1926)
 Silver Circus (1928)
 Count Stefan (1928)
 The Higgler (1930)
 Nixey's Harlequin (1931)
 Fares Please! (1931)
 Crotty Shinkwin and The Beauty Spot (1932)
 Dunky Fitlow (1933)
 Ring the Bells of Heaven (1933)
 Emergency Exit (1934)
 Pink Furniture (1930)
 Polly Oliver (1935)
 Ninepenny Flute (1937)
 You Never Know, Do You? (1939)
 Ugly Anna (1944)
 Fearful Pleasures (1946)
 Selected Tales (1946)
 The Dark Eyed Lady – Fourteen Tales (1947)
 Collected Tales (1948)
 Lucy in Her Pink Coat (1954)
 Selected Stories (1972)
 The Collected Tales of A. E. Coppard (1976)
 The Higgler and Other Stories (1991)
 The Man from the Caravan and Other Stories (1999)
 Father Raven and Other Tales (2006)
 Weep not my wanton : selected short stories (2013)

Poetry collections
 Hips and Haws (1922)
 Yokohoma Garland & Other Poems (1926)
 Pelaga and Other Poems (1926)
 The Collected Poems of A. E. Coppard (1928)
 Cherry Ripe: Poems (1935)
 Simple Day: Selected Poems (1978)

Chapbooks
 The Hundredth Story of A. E. Coppard (1930)( Illustrated by Robert Gibbings)
 Cheefoo  (1932) 
 Good Samaritans (1934)
 These Hopes of Heaven (1934)
 Tapster's Tapestry :A Tale (1938) (Illustrated by Gwenda Morgan)

Non-Fiction
 Rummy: that noble game expounded in prose, poetry, diagram and engraving (1932) (Illustrated by Robert Gibbings).

As editor
 Songs from Robert Burns. Selected by A. E. Coppard, with wood engravings by Mabel Annesley (1925)

Contributor
 Consequences, a complete story in the manner of the old parlour game, in nine chapters, each by a different author (1932)
(Coppard was one of the contributors to this book; the others were Seán Ó Faoláin, Elizabeth Bowen,
John Van Druten, Gladys Bronwyn Stern, Ronald Fraser, Malachi Whitaker, Norah Hoult and Hamish Maclaren.)
 The Fairies Return, or New Tales for Old (1934)

Autobiography
 It's Me, O Lord! (1957)

Further reading
 Fabes, Gilbert H., The First Editions of A. E. Coppard, A. P. Herbert and Charles Morgan, 1933 London: Myers.
 Jehin, A. Remarks on the Style of A.E. Coppard. Buenos Aires, 1944.
 Saul, George Brandon, A.E. Coppard: His Life and Poetry,1932, University of Pennsylvania, PhD dissertation.
 Schwartz, Jacob with foreword and notes by A. E. Coppard, A Bibliography of A. E. Coppard - The Writings of Alfred Edgar Coppard, 1931.
 Smith, Frank Edmund, Flynn: A Study of A. E. Coppard and His Short Fiction (1973).

References

Notes

External links
 
 
 
 
 AE Coppard at the Supernatural Fiction Database
 
 
 
 Finding aid to Alfred Edgar Coppard letters at Columbia University. Rare Book & Manuscript Library.
A. E. Coppard Collection. General Collection, Beinecke Rare Book and Manuscript Library, Yale University

1878 births
1957 deaths
Chapbook writers
English fantasy writers
English horror writers
English male novelists
English male poets
English male short story writers
English short story writers
People from Folkestone